The 2008 Hull City Council election took place on 1 May 2008 to elect members of Hull City Council in England. One third of the council was up for election and the Liberal Democrats retained control of the council with an increased majority from a situation of ruling under no overall control.

After the election, the composition of the council was
Liberal Democrat 33
Labour 19
N.E.W. Hull Independent 3
Conservative 2
Independent 1
Non-aligned 1

Campaign
At the 2007 election the Liberal Democrats had won an overall majority of 1 but subsequently suffered 2 defections meaning that they went into the 2008 election as a minority administration. In total 81 candidates stood in the 2008 election including 20 each from the Liberal Democrats, Labour and Conservative parties. Other candidates standing in the election came from the English Democrats, Greens and United Kingdom Independence Party as well as some independents candidates. The Liberal Democrats were expected to recover seats in the election which they had lost when councillors had defected to sit as independents.

Election result
The results saw the Liberal Democrats regain a majority on the council after gaining 5 seats. They won Newington and Pickering wards from Labour, as well as Beverley, Boothferry and Derringham wards from independents. Labour did make one gain in St Andrews from an independent and saw their former leader, Colin Inglis, returned to the council in Myton. The Liberal Democrats now controlled 33 seats on the council as compared to 19 for Labour. Overall turnout in the election was 25.5%.

Ward results

No elections were held in Bransholme East, Bransholme West and University wards.

References

2008 English local elections
2008
2000s in Kingston upon Hull